Cattenières is a commune of the Nord department in northern France. Cattenières station has rail connections to Douai and Saint-Quentin.

See also
Communes of the Nord department

References

Communes of Nord (French department)